Pocono Summit is a unincorporated community and census-designated place located in Monroe County, Pennsylvania. Parts of Pocono Summit are located in the municipalities of Coolbaugh and Tobyhanna townships.

Geography
Pocono Summit is located at  (41.111, -75.386). According to the U.S. Census Bureau, Pocono Summit has a total area of 16.1 square miles (41.7 km), 95% of it land. Pocono Summit is home to Stillwater Lake and Pocono Summit Lake.

Demographics
 
As of the census of 2010, there were 2,964 people living in the area.

Education
The Pocono Mountain School District's Sullivan Trail campus is located in Pocono Summit; the campus includes Pocono Mountain West High School and Pocono Mountain West Junior High School.

Recreation
Pocono Summit is home to Camp Minsi, a Boy Scout camp located on the western shores of Stillwater Lake.

The area also includes portions of Pennsylvania State Game Lands 127.

Transportation
Pennsylvania State Route 940 passes over Pennsylvania State Route 314 in Pocono Summit. Interstate 380 runs north-south along the edge of the town.

Until the early 1960s, the Lackawanna Railroad's and then the Erie Lackawanna Railroad's Lake Cities, Phoebe Snow and Twilight made stops westbound at the Pocono Summit station; the Phoebe Snow and the Pocono Express made stops eastbound at the station. In the latter years of Erie Lackawanna passenger train through the Poconos, Pocono Summit was the last remaining station, between Scranton to the northwest and Cresco to the east, to have service, offering a stop on the Lake Cities westbound.

References

Pocono Mountains
Unincorporated communities in Monroe County, Pennsylvania
Unincorporated communities in Pennsylvania